Guozhuangzi is a station on Line 14 of the Beijing Subway. This station opened on May 5, 2013.

Station Layout 
The station has an underground island platform.

Exits 
There are 4 exits, lettered A, B, C, and D. Exits A and B are accessible.

References

Railway stations in China opened in 2013
Beijing Subway stations in Fengtai District